De Bohun Primary School (also known as De Bohun Primary School and Children's Centre and simply referred to as De Bohun School) is a 2–11 mixed, community primary school in Southgate, Greater London, England. It was established in 1936 and is a Grade II listed building.

History 
De Bohun Primary School was established in 1936 and divided into junior mixed and infants' departments a year later. Juniors occupied the first floor and infants the ground floor from 1955. The school had 324 juniors and 289 infants, including 60 nursery children in 1973. In December 2009, the school was in the bottom ten of state primary schools in London with the lowest percentage of students passing SATs in both English and maths combined, at 37%.

A book titled Outdoor Learning in the Early Years: Management and Innovation by Helen Bilton was published in 2010. It described the school's reception children as being "very clear what the expectations of the class are and they know that the staff are willing to pursue and develop their interests. Children come into the room confident and very willing to get going with their current interests".

In July 2012, the condition of the school building was described by its headteacher Terry Scott, as "looking like a war-torn building" and "not fit for a school". There were cracks in some of the walls, some of the masonry from the windows ledges had come away, windows that don't open and the roof in poor condition. It was noted as being expensive to repair due to the school being a listed building. Along with other schools in the London Borough of Enfield, the school was under pressure to increase its intake because of a boom in the birth rate and many families moving out of inner London to the suburbs, due to the benefit caps making it unaffordable.

The school was placed into 'special measures' by Ofsted following its inspection in October 2012 but was rated 'good' in July 2016. In August 2013, along with a number of other primary schools in London, it was part of a £1.2 million 'Size and Lung Function in Children' or 'SLIC' study by the UCL Great Ormond Street Institute of Child Health, where its researchers visited these schools in a mobile testing laboratory and provided science workshops alongside the lung measurements. It was funded primarily by the Wellcome Trust and "provided the first clear evidence of the extent to which lung capacities differ between healthy children of different ethnicities".

It was awarded the Inclusion Quality Mark (IQM) 'Centre of Excellence' status in November 2018.

See also 
 Salcombe Preparatory School, whose Green Road building is adjacent and was built at the same time.

References

External links 

 

Southgate, London
Oakwood, London
Community schools in the London Borough of Enfield
Primary schools in the London Borough of Enfield
Modernist architecture in London
Grade II listed buildings in the London Borough of Enfield
Grade II listed educational buildings
Educational institutions established in 1936
1936 establishments in England